Orville Frenette (born May 2, 1927) is a judge currently serving on the Federal Court of Canada.

Bibliography
 L'incidence du décès de la victime d'un délit ou d'un quasi-délit sur l'action en indemnité, Librairie de l'Université d'Ottawa, 1961, 236 p.
 L'évaluation du préjudice en cas de blessures et en cas de décès : supplément, Hull, Québec : O. Frenette, 1973, 158 p.
 L'évaluation du préjudice en cas de blessures corporelles, de décès et de certaines atteintes aux droits fondamentaux de la personne : Supplément 2003, Librairie Wilson & Lafleur Limitee, 2003, 221 p.

References

1927 births
Living people
Judges of the Federal Court of Canada
People from Fort Frances